Rhododendron fuyuanense (富源杜鹃) is a rhododendron species native to eastern Yunnan, China, where it grows at altitudes of about . Flowers are purplish red.

References
 "Rhododendron fuyuanense", Z. H. Yang, Acta Phytotax. Sin. 35: 189. 1997.

fuyuanense